Yuriy Kostyantynovych Tkach (born 9 November 1983) is a Ukrainian comedian and actor. He is known for his acting roles in the Ukrainian sitcoms Country U and Once Upon a Time Near Poltava, and has been a participant on the reality shows Tantsi z zirkamy and Laughter League.

Biography
Yuriy Tkach was born in 1983 in the city of Dnipro (then known as Dnepropetrovsk) in the Ukrainian Soviet Socialist Republic. 

He studied at the National Metallurgical Academy of Ukraine, where he organized the Dnepropetrovsk National Team to compete on KVN, a nationally televised comedy competition show. The group eventually rose to national and international prominence, placing third in the Ukrainian National Higher League of KVN in 2009 and becoming a silver medalist of the International Higher League of KVN in 2013.

In 2013, he was cast by Kvartal 95 Studio as the husband of a main character in the Ukrainian sitcom Country U. Soon after, in 2014, he accepted a lead position in the same role on the Country U spinoff Once Upon a Time Near Poltava, this time as one of the two lead roles along with his costar Irina Soponaru. Also in 2014, Tkach was cast in a lead role on the Kvartal 95 sitcom Stories U.

In 2017, he was a celebrity contestant on the Ukrainian version of Dancing with the Stars, Tantsi z zirkamy.

In 2018, Tkach became a judge and coach on Laughter League, a comedy competition show.

In 2019, he replaced Volodymyr Zelensky (who resigned to run for President of Ukraine) as a judge on the Make Me Laugh-inspired gameshow Crack Up the Comic on 1+1. He became a contestant on the Ukrainian adaptation of Lip Sync Battle in 2021.

Filmography

See also
Kvartal 95 Studio
1+1 (TV channel)
Tantsi z zirkamy
Volodymyr Zelensky

References

1983 births
Living people
People from Dnipro
National Metallurgical Academy of Ukraine alumni
Ukrainian male comedians
Ukrainian television presenters
21st-century Ukrainian male actors
Ukrainian male voice actors
Ukrainian parodists